Vesturhópsvatn is a lake in northern Iceland. It is located in the municipality of Húnaþing vestra.

Geography 
The surface of the Vesturhópsvatn is about 10 km2; the maximum depth is 28m.

References 

Lakes of Iceland